The Mustang Mountains are a mountain range located in the southeast region of Arizona, are on the northwest side of Fort Huachuca. They are found at the southern end of the Whetstone Mountains.

The highest peak rises to 6,469 feet.

References 
 Peakbagger.com

Mountain ranges of Cochise County, Arizona
Mountain ranges of Arizona